Croatia participated in the Eurovision Song Contest 2005 with the song "Vukovi umiru sami" written by Franjo Valentić and Boris Novković. The song was performed by Boris Novković featuring Lado Members. The Croatian broadcaster Croatian Radiotelevision (HRT) organised the national final Dora 2005 to select the Croatian entry for the 2005 contest in Kyiv, Ukraine. Twenty entries competed in the national final which consisted of three stages: a quarter-final, two semi-finals and a final. Eighteen entries qualified from the quarter-final between 21 and 24 February 2004, and seven entries qualified from each semi-final on 3 and 4 March 2005 to compete in the final on 5 March 2005. In the final, the winner was selected over two rounds of voting. In the first round, the top three entries advanced to the superfinal following the combination of votes from a seven-member jury panel and a public televote. In the superfinal, "Vukovi umiru sami" performed by Boris Novković featuring Lado Members was selected as the winner based entirely on a public televote.

Croatia competed in the semi-final of the Eurovision Song Contest which took place on 19 May 2005. Performing during the show in position 20, "Vukovi umiru sami" was announced among the top 10 entries of the semi-final and therefore qualified to compete in the final on 21 May. It was later revealed that Croatia placed fourth out of the 25 participating countries in the semi-final with 169 points. In the final, Croatia performed in position 18 and placed eleventh out of the 24 participating countries, scoring 115 points.

Background 

The nation's best result in the contest was fourth, which it achieved on two occasions: in 1996 with the song "Sveta ljubav" performed by Maja Blagdan and in 1999 with the song "Marija Magdalena" performed by Doris Dragović. In 2004, Croatia managed to qualify to the final with Ivan Mikulić and the song "You Are the Only One".

The Croatian national broadcaster, Croatian Radiotelevision (HRT), broadcasts the event within Croatia and organises the selection process for the nation's entry. Since 1993, HRT organised the national final Dora in order to select the Croatian entry for the Eurovision Song Contest, a method that was continued for their 2005 participation.

Before Eurovision

Dora 2005 
Dora 2005 was the thirteenth edition of the Croatian national selection Dora which selected Croatia's entry for the Eurovision Song Contest 2005. The competition consisted of a quarter-final between 7 and 25 February 2005, two semi-finals on 3 and 4 March 2005 and a final on 5 March 2005, all taking place at the Studio 10 of HRT in Zagreb. The quarter-final was broadcast on HTV2, while the semi-finals and final were broadcast on HTV1. All shows were also broadcast online via the broadcaster's website hrt.hr.

Format 
Twenty songs competed in Dora 2005 which consisted of three rounds: a quarter-final, two semi-finals and a final. Twenty songs competed in the quarter-final with the top eighteen proceeding to the semi-finals. Nine songs competed in each semi-final with the top seven proceeding to complete the fourteen-song lineup in the final. The results of the quarter-final and semi-finals were determined by public televoting and the votes from a jury panel. The winning song in the final was selected over two rounds of voting: the first round selected the top three songs via votes from the public and jury, while the second round (superfinal) determined the winner solely by public televoting. Ties in all shows were decided in favour of the entry that received the most points from the jury. Public voting included options for telephone and SMS voting.

The jury that voted in all three rounds consisted of:

 Aleksandar Kostadinov – entertainment editor at HTV
 Josip Guberina – music director of HRT
 Zoran Brajša – music editor at HR
 Nikša Bratoš – musician
 Larisa Lipovac – choreographer
 Nevenka Mikac – representative of Večernji list
 Zrinka Ferina – representative of Extra

Competing entries 
HRT in collaboration with record companies directly invited twenty artists and songs to participate in the competition. The competing entries were announced on 27 January 2005 and among the artists were Olja Dešić of Fiumens who represented Croatia in the Eurovision Song Contest 1993 as part of Put, Magazin which represented Croatia in the Eurovision Song Contest 1995, Danijela Martinović who represented Croatia in the Eurovision Song Contest 1995 as part of Magazin and 1998, Goran Karan who represented Croatia in the Eurovision Song Contest 2000 and Vesna Pisarović who represented Croatia in the Eurovision Song Contest 2002.

Shows

Quarter-final 
Between 7 and 18 February 2005, the competing artists performed their entries live during the ten-show programme Kome zvoni Dora hosted by Mirko Fodor and Zlatko Turkalj. The eighteen qualifiers for the semi-finals were determined by a 50/50 combination of votes from a seven-member jury panel and a public televote held between 21 and 24 February 2005 and announced during a press conference on 25 February 2005.

Semi-finals 
The two semi-finals took place on 3 and 4 March 2005, hosted by Duško Ćurlić and Robert Ferlin with Mirko Fodor and Zlatko Turkalj hosting segments from the green room. The seven qualifiers for the final from each semi-final were determined by a 50/50 combination of votes from a seven-member jury panel and a public televote. 

In addition to the performances of the competing entries, dance group "Rhythm of the Dance" performed as the interval act during the first semi-final, while 1994 Croatian Eurovision entrant Tony Cetinski, 1999 Croatian Eurovision entrant Doris Dragović, Jasna Zlokić, Massimo, Miroslav Škoro, Natali Dizdar and Petar Grašo performed as the interval acts during the second semi-final.

Final 
The final took place on 5 March 2005, hosted by Duško Ćurlić and Robert Ferlin with Mirko Fodor and Zlatko Turkalj hosting segments from the green room. The winner was selected over two rounds of voting. In the first round, a 50/50 combination of votes from a seven-member jury panel and a public televote selected the top three entries to proceed to the second round, the superfinal. In the superfinal, the winner, "Vukovi umiru sami" performed by Boris Novković featuring Lado Members, was determined exclusively by a public televote. In addition to the performances of the competing entries, Björn Again and 2004 Croatian Eurovision entrant Ivan Mikulić performed as the interval acts during the show.

At Eurovision
According to Eurovision rules, all nations with the exceptions of the host country, the "Big Four" (France, Germany, Spain and the United Kingdom), and the ten highest placed finishers in the 2004 contest are required to qualify from the semi-final on 19 May 2005 in order to compete for the final on 21 May 2005; the top ten countries from the semi-final progress to the final. On 22 March 2005, a special allocation draw was held which determined the running order for the semi-final and Croatia was set to perform in position 20, following the entry from Switzerland and before the entry from Bulgaria. At the end of the show, Croatia was announced as having finished in the top 10 and subsequently qualifying for the grand final. It was later revealed that Croatia placed fourth in the semi-final, receiving a total of 169 points. The draw for the running order for the final was done by the presenters during the announcement of the ten qualifying countries during the semi-final and Croatia was drawn to perform in position 18, following the entry from Germany and before the entry from Greece. Croatia placed eleventh in the final, scoring 115 points.

Both the semi-final and the final were broadcast in Croatia on HRT. The semi-final featured commentary by Zlatko Turkalj, while the final featured commentary by Duško Ćurlić. The Croatian spokesperson, who announced the Croatian votes during the final, was Barbara Kolar.

Voting 
Below is a breakdown of points awarded to Croatia and awarded by Croatia in the semi-final and grand final of the contest. The nation awarded its 12 points to Macedonia in the semi-final and to Serbia and Montenegro in the final of the contest.

Points awarded to Croatia

Points awarded by Croatia

References

2005
Countries in the Eurovision Song Contest 2005
Eurovision